Bohumil Smolík (8 April 1943 – 29 September 2008) was a Czech footballer. He played in eight matches for the Czechoslovakia national football team in 1965 and 1966.

References

1943 births
2008 deaths
Czechoslovak footballers
Czechoslovakia international footballers
Place of birth missing
Association footballers not categorized by position